The Sasanian conquest of Jerusalem occurred after a brief siege of the city by the Sasanian military in 614 CE, and was a significant event in the Byzantine–Sasanian War of 602–628 that took place after the Sasanian king Khosrow II appointed his spahbod (army chief), Shahrbaraz, to take control of the Byzantine-ruled areas of the Near East for the Sasanian Persian Empire. Following the Sasanian victory in Antioch a year earlier, Shahrbaraz had successfully conquered Caesarea Maritima, the administrative capital of the Byzantine province of Palaestina Prima. By this time, the grand inner harbour had silted up and was useless; however, the Byzantine emperor Anastasius I Dicorus had reconstructed the outer harbour, and Caesarea Maritima remained an important maritime city. The city and its harbour gave the Sasanian Empire strategic access to the Mediterranean Sea. Following the outbreak of a Jewish revolt against the Byzantine emperor Heraclius, the Sasanian Persians were joined by the Jewish leaders Nehemiah ben Hushiel and Benjamin of Tiberias, who enlisted and armed Jewish rebels from Tiberias, Nazareth and the mountain cities of the Galilee as well as from other parts of the southern Levant, after which they marched on the city of Jerusalem with the Sasanian military. Some 20,000–26,000 Jewish rebels joined the war against the Byzantine Empire. The joint Jewish–Sasanian force later captured Jerusalem; this occurred either without resistance or after a siege and breaching of the wall with artillery, depending on the source.

Background

Jews and Samaritans were persecuted frequently by the Byzantines resulting in numerous revolts. Byzantine religious propaganda developed strong anti-Jewish elements. In several cases Jews tried to help support the Sasanian advance. A pogrom in Antioch in 608 would lead to a Jewish revolt in 610 which was crushed. Jews also revolted in both Tyre and Acre in 610. The Jews of Tyre were massacred in reprisal. Unlike in earlier times when Jews had supported Christians in the fight against Shapur I, the Byzantines had now become viewed as oppressors.

Following the Bar Kokhba revolt in 135 CE Jews were prohibited from entering the city. Constantine allowed Jews to enter for one day each year, during the holiday of Tisha B'Av. In 438 CE the Empress Eudocia removed the ban on Jews entering the city. However, following violent Christian opposition the ban was reinstated. The ban on settlement was maintained until the Arab conquest, except during the reign of the emperor Julian and from 614–617 under the Persians. Due to these circumstances Jerusalem is thought to have had only a small Jewish population prior to the events of 614.

Revolt and its aftermath

Following the unopposed capture of Jerusalem, control of the city was handed to Nehemiah ben Hushiel and Benjamin of Tiberias. Nehemiah was then appointed the ruler of Jerusalem. He began making arrangements for the building of the Third Temple, and sorting out genealogies to establish a new High Priesthood. After only a few months a Christian revolt occurred. Nehemiah ben Hushiel and his council of sixteen righteous were killed along with many other Jews, some throwing themselves off the city walls.

Following the outburst of violence in Jerusalem the surviving Jews fled to Shahrbaraz's encampment at Caesarea. Christians were able to briefly retake the city before the walls were breached by Shahrbaraz's forces who lay siege to the city. According to Antiochus Strategos, the abbot Modestos set out to Jericho where he mustered a force from the Byzantine troops which were garrisoned there. However, once the Byzantine troops caught sight of the overwhelming Persian army encamped outside the city walls, they fled, fearing a suicidal battle. Sources vary on how long the siege lasted. Depending on the source it lasted 19, 20 or 21 days.

According to Sebeos the siege resulted in a total Christian death toll of 17,000. However, other sources put the number much higher, claiming over 60,000 dead. Similarly, the number massacred near the Mamilla reservoir is disputed, with separate sources providing numbers of 4,518 and 24,518. Later Christian sources estimated the overall death toll to be over 90,000, a number which is likely exaggerated. In addition, around 35,000 to 37,000 people, including the patriarch Zacharias, are said to have been deported to be sold into slavery. The city is said to have been burnt down. However, neither wide spread burning nor destruction of churches have been found in the archaeological record. The search for the True Cross is said to have involved the torture of clergymen. Once found, the True Cross was carried off to Ctesiphon.

Modestos was appointed over the city. Damage was done to many Christian churches and other buildings. By the first half of 616 order had been restored in Jerusalem and Modestos had authorized the reoccupation of St Sabas. Reconstruction on the following churches was under way: Church of the Holy Sepulchre, Golgotha, the 'mother of churches' at Sion and Chapel of the Ascension. Modestos' letter gives the impression that the reconstruction of these sites was already completed. However this is unlikely to be the case. By 617 CE the Persians had reversed their policy and sided with the Christians over the Jews, probably because of pressure from Mesopotamian Christians in Persia itself. However it does not appear that Jews were violently expelled from Jerusalem, as Sebeos thought. Instead Modestos' letter and other sources seem to imply that further Jewish settlers were banned from settling in or around Jerusalem. A small synagogue on the Temple Mount was also demolished. Following the change in policy the condition of the Mesopotamian deportees also improved. Sebeos records that they were each resettled according to their prior trade.

In 628, following the deposition of Khosrau II, Kavadh II made peace with Heraclius giving Palaestina Prima and the True Cross back to the Byzantines. The conquered city and the Holy Cross would remain in Sasanian hands until they were returned by Shahrbaraz. Shahrbaraz and his son Niketas, who converted to Christianity, would control Jerusalem until at least the late summer/early autumn of 629. On March 21 630 Heraclius marched in triumph into Jerusalem with the True Cross.

Heraclius came as victor into the Land of Israel and the Jews of Tiberias and Nazareth, under the leadership of Benjamin of Tiberias, surrendered and asked for his protection. It is said that Benjamin even accompanied Heraclius on his voyage to Jerusalem and Benjamin was persuaded to convert, Benjamin obtained a general pardon for himself and the Jews. He was baptized in Nablus in the house of Eustathios, an influential Christian. However once Heraclius reached Jerusalem he was persuaded to go back on his promise to Benjamin of Tiberias. According to Eutychius (887–940), the Christians population and monks of Jerusalem convinced the Emperor to break his word. Some modern scholars ascribe the story of the "Oath of Heraclius" to the realm of legend doubting that Heraclius ever made such a promise, instead ascribing this as a product of later apologists. In atonement for the violation of the emperor's oath to the Jews, the monks are said to have pledged themselves to a yearly fast, which is still observed by the Copts, called the Fast of Heraclius. Jews were expelled from Jerusalem and were not allowed to settle within a three-mile radius. A general massacre of the Jewish population ensued.

Written sources

Sebeos' account
The Armenian bishop and historian Sebeos wrote an account of the fall of Jerusalem. Sebeos' account does not use the polemical language of Antiochus. Sebeos writes that at first the inhabitants of Jerusalem voluntarily submitted to the Jews and Persians, however after a few months the governor appointed by Khosrau II to rule Jerusalem was killed in a Christian revolt.

Various dates for the revolt have been given: 9 April or 19 May 614, and 25 June 615. Sebeos writes that during the revolt many Jews were killed. Some throwing themselves off the city walls to escape. The remaining Jews fled to the Sasanian general. Different names are given for this general: Khoream, Erazmiozan and Xorheam However they are all thought to refer to Shahrbaraz, who was known to Armenian sources as Khoream. Shahrbaraz's campaigns are well documented by other sources helping to put time constraints on the siege. Shahrbaraz assembled his troops and went and encamped around Jerusalem and besieged it for 19 days. The walls were breached by undermining the foundations. The Christian death toll of 17,000 was later corrupted to 57,000 in T'ovma Artsruni work History of the House of the Artsrunik'''. 35,000 people including the patriarch Zacharias were deported to Mesopotamia. For three days the Persian forces slaughtered and plundered the inhabitants of the city. The city was burnt down. The Jews were then driven from the city and an archpriest named Modestos was appointed over the city.

Antiochus' account
Antiochus Strategos was a 7th-century Byzantine Greek monk living in Palestine. Again dates for the start of the siege vary. Dates given are April 13 614, April 15 614, May 3 614 or May 5 614. On the twentieth day or according to the Georgian text the twenty-first day the walls were breached. Ballistae were used to bring down the walls. According to Antiochus, shortly after the Persian army entered Jerusalem, an "unprecedented looting and sacrilege" took place. In his words "church after church was burned down alongside the innumerable Christian artifacts, which were stolen or damaged by the ensuing arson". Antiochus Strategos further claimed that captive Christians were gathered near Mamilla reservoir and the Jews offered to help them escape death if they "become Jews and deny Christ". The Christian captives refused, and the Jews in anger purchased the Christians from the Persians and massacred them on the spot. Antiochus wrote:
Then the Jews... as of old they bought the Lord from the Jews with silver, so they purchased Christians out of the reservoir; for they gave the Persians silver, and they bought a Christian and slew him like a sheep.

Some versions of Antiochus' manuscript record a total Christian death tolls as high as 66,509. Other copies report approximately half this number. The greatest number were found at Mamilla 24,518 corpses; many more than were found anywhere else in the city. Other copies of Strategos's manuscripts report fewer corpses were found at Mamilla, 4,518 or 4,618 corpses. Antiochus' work was originally written in Greek. Only Arabic and Georgian translations survive.

Dionysius' account
Dionysius of Tel Mahre's account was written much later in the 9th century. It gives a body count of 90,000. This number is thought to be dubious.

Theophanes' account
Theophanes the Confessor another 9th-century author records that "some say it was 90,000" in reference to the number of Christians killed.

Sefer Zerubbabel
The Sefer Zerubbabel is a medieval Hebrew apocalypse written in the style of biblical visions (e.g. Daniel, Ezekiel) placed into the mouth of Zerubbabel. It is thought to have been written at least partially during the beginning of the 7th century.

In the Sefer Zerubbabel Aaron's rod, Elijah and Nehemiah ben Hushiel will be hidden in the city of Tiberias. After Nehemiah ben Hushiel takes' possession of Jerusalem he proceeds to sorts out Israel's genealogical lists according to their families. He is killed in the fifth year which would be 619 during the month of Av (July – August). The Sefer Zerubbabel states that Shiroi King of Persia will stab Nehemiah ben Hushiel and Israel. His thoroughly crushed corpse will be thrown down before the gates of Jerusalem. And sixteen of the righteous shall be killed with him. Armilus enters Jerusalem on the 14th day of the new year during the month of Nisan. Assuming the year is 628. This would coincide to March 28 628.

Kavadh II made peace with Heraclius in 628 after the reign of Khosrau II. Armilus is thought to be a cryptogram for Heraclius.

Poems by Eleazar ben Killir
Three piyyut attributed to Eleazar ben Killir are thought to be based on an early version of the Sefer Zerubbabel.

The first is believed to be dated between 629 and 634. In the text the Jews set up an altar and offer sacrifices, however they are not allowed to erect a sanctuary. The Jewish leader who is called Messiah ben Joseph arises among them and within three months reaches the top. However he is killed by the Persian chief commander in a small sanctuary shortly after.

In a second piyyut, which is undatable, Messiah ben Joseph is named as Nehemiah ben Hushiel.

A third piyyut titled "Oto ha-yom" is dated later, as the Persians have been defeated by the Byzantines. However, a king from Arabia then invades. This poem is thought to data from the early years of the Arab invasion. Nehemiah ben Hushiel is not mentioned. The Messiah ben David of the Sefer Zerubbabel, Menahem ben Ammiel, is now called Messiah ben Joseph.

Quran
The fall of Palaestina Prima to the Persians was mentioned as a contemporary event in the 30th sūrah of the Qur'an, Sūrat ar-Rūm. It went on to predict the imminent defeat of the Persians by the Byzantines:

"The Romans have been defeated in the land nearby, and they, after their defeat, will be victorious. In a few years -- God's is the command before and after that -- and on that day the believers will rejoice, with the Help of God. He helps whom He pleases; and He is the Mighty, the Merciful." Qur'an 30:1-6 

Other sources
Historians have been able to piece together the events following the fall of Jerusalem based on other sources as well. A brief abridged list of the many relevant documents is given below.

Muhammad ibn Jarir al-Tabari and the Khuzistan Chronicle both report that the search for fragments of the true cross involved torturing clergymen. The Opusculum de Persica captivitate is a document attributed to Modestos. It gives a death toll of 65,000. This number may give an idea of the total Christian population in and around Jerusalem. The Chronicon Paschale is notable because it does not accuse the Jews of Anti-Christian violence or sedition during the fall of Jerusalem in 614. It is loosely dated to June 614. Another important document is Modestos' Letter.

Archaeological evidence
Despite the claims of large scale destruction, the archaeological evidence does not reveal layers of destruction associated with the Persian conquest. There was also no hard evidence found for the widespread destruction of churches.

A significant number of burial sites were allocated according to Strategos. A mass burial grave at Mamilla cave was discovered in 1989 by Israeli archeologist Ronny Reich near the site where Strategos recorded the massacre took place. The large number of bones "suggests that thousands of people were buried there," though the poor preservation permitted the identification of only 526 individuals. Other mass burial sites have also been found although they cannot be accurately dated to the Persian conquest of Jerusalem. Yet, excavations of Jerusalem show a continuous habitation in Jerusalem neighborhoods and essentially little impact of population during the period of Persian governorship. As stated by archaeologist Gideon Avni:... all excavated sites in Jerusalem show a clear pattern of continuity, with no evidence for destruction by the Persian conquest of 614 or the Arab conquest of 636.'' 
Demographic continuity might have resulted from population exchange by the victorious Jewish rebels, but apparently also the Christian habitation remained relatively constant, despite the disturbance by the Persian conquest, and no significant impact on the population of Jerusalem was made during the following period of Sassanid-Jewish dominance.

In 2013, a treasure was found in the Old City of Jerusalem by archaeologists, containing a large hoard of Persian coins from the 5th to early 7th centuries and a golden medallion. According to Hebrew University archaeologist Dr. Eilat Mazar, the contents of the discovery in early September 2013 were two bundles containing thirty-six gold coins, gold and silver jewelry, and a gold medallion, ten centimeters in diameter, adorned with images of a menorah, a shofar and a Torah scroll. The item is thought to have been a decoration to hang around a Torah scroll as a breast plate. The find was discovered in a ruined Byzantine public structure a mere 50 meters from the Temple Mount's southern wall. The way the items were found suggests one bundle was carefully hidden underground, whereas the second was apparently abandoned in haste and scattered across the floor. Given dating, Dr. Mazar suggested the items were abandoned following the Christian re-establishment of control of the city. Since there was only a small Jewish presence in Jerusalem during the Byzantine period, Mazar thinks the treasure was brought to the city by Jewish emissaries after the Persian conquest in 614 CE.

See also
 Jewish–Roman wars
 List of conflicts in the Near East
 Monastery of the Virgins
 Siege of Jerusalem (disambiguation), list of sieges for, and battles of, Jerusalem

References

Primary sources
 Antiochus Strategos, The Capture of Jerusalem by the Persians in 614 AD, F. C. Conybeare, English Historical Review 25 (1910) pp. 502–517.
 Sebeos chapter 24, [Robert Bedrosian]
 Sefer Zerubbabel, [John C. Reeves. University of North Carolina at Charlotte.]

Further reading
 

Jerusalem
610s conflicts
610s in the Byzantine Empire
610s in the Sasanian Empire
614
7th-century Judaism
Holy Land during Byzantine rule
Sieges involving the Byzantine Empire
Sieges involving the Sasanian Empire
Sasanian
Sieges of the Roman–Persian Wars